Darrell Sandeen (July 13, 1930 – January 22, 2009) was a character actor who specialized in playing menacing or offbeat people. Perhaps his best-known role was as corrupt cop "Buzz" Meeks in L.A. Confidential.

Sandeen started as a stage actor on Broadway, appearing in the original casts of Young Abe Lincoln, Can-Can, Here's Love, a revival of Guys and Dolls, A Joyful Noise, and The Fig Leaves are Falling. He can be heard on three cast albums.

Moving to Hollywood, he appeared on such television shows as Bonanza and Route 66. He was featured in L.A. Confidential, Blazing Saddles, and They Call Me Bruce?.  Sandeen continued acting until shortly before his death; later roles included appearing as a possible conspirator in the Kennedy assassination in Interview with the Assassin, playing opposite porn star Mary Carey in Pervert!, and playing Homeless Al in String Theory. Sandeen remained active in theatre as part of the Musical Theatre Guild in Los Angeles.

Sandeen died on January 22, 2009, of complications following a stroke.

Filmography

References

External links
 
 

1930 births
2009 deaths
Male actors from Chicago
American male film actors
20th-century American male actors
American male stage actors
American male television actors